Janet Smith (born 20 October 1968) is a British sprinter. She competed in the women's 4 × 400 metres relay at the 1988 Summer Olympics.

References

External links
 

1968 births
Living people
Athletes (track and field) at the 1988 Summer Olympics
British female sprinters
Olympic athletes of Great Britain
Place of birth missing (living people)
Olympic female sprinters